Vukova Gorica is a village in Croatia. It is connected by the D3 highway.

Notable residents 
Josip Boljkovac (1920-2014), former Croatian Minister of the Interior
Ivan Šubašić (1892-1955), Ban of Croatian Banovina and short-time Prime Minister of Yugoslavia

References

Populated places in Karlovac County